Saihanba National Forest Park is a national forest park located in Weichang Manchu and Mongol Autonomous County, Chengde, Hebei, China, with Inner Mongolian Plateau standing in the northwest, covering an area of . Established in 1962, this is a multifunctional botanical park integrating scientific research, plant species collection and display as well as tourism. Saihanba is often called "the Green Lung of north China".

History
In the Liao (907-1125) and Jin dynasties (1115-1234), Saihanba was a hunting-field for the imperial household.

In 1681, Kangxi Emperor (1654-1722) set the Mulan Paddock in the area.

In 1863, the Qing government allows farmers to reclaim land here, forests and wetlands were beginning to disappear. Saihanba became a barren desert. Then sandstorms plague Beijing, Tianjin and other northern China cities.

In 1962, in order to put an end to the sandstorms, the State Forestry Administration set the Saihanba Mechanical Forest Farm here. Then the first generation of tree-planters came here, they tried to green the barren desert and turn it into an oasis.

In May 1993, it was designated as a "National Forest Park".

In 2000, it has been categorized as a 5A level tourist site by the China National Tourism Administration.

In May 2007, the park was rated as a "National Nature Reserves" by the State Council of China.

On December 5, 2017, the Saihanba Afforestation Community won the honor of Champions of the Earth in the category of Inspiration and Action due to its efforts to transform degraded land into a lush paradise, the highest environmental honor provided by the United Nations Environment Programme.

Geography

Climate
The earliest recorded snowfall has been in August, and the latest in June.

Natural history
There are more than 618 species and 312 genera vascular plants cultivated in the park, including Eleutherococcus gracilistylus, Astragalus propinquus, Glycine, and Agropyron.

Within the boundaries of the park, the following number of species are known to live: 261 species of mammals, 39 species of birds, 32 species of fish, and about 660 species of insects.

Attractions
 Qixing Lake
 Taifeng Lake
 Saihan Tower
 Headwater of Luan River
 Moon Lake
 Yudaokou Grassland and Forest Scenic Spot
 Hongsongwa National Nature Reserves

Transportation
 Siheyong railway station

Gallery

See also
 List of protected areas of China

References

External links
 

Parks in Hebei
Chengde
AAAAA-rated tourist attractions
Forest parks in China